The American daily newspaper The New York Times publishes multiple weekly list ranking the best selling books in the United States. The lists are split in three genres—fiction, nonfiction and children's books. Both the fiction and nonfiction lists are further split into multiple lists.

Changes to the list
On July 23, 2000, a new list was created for best-selling children's books. This controversial decision was due to the dominance of the Harry Potter series, which had occupied three of the top spots for over a year.

Fiction
The following list ranks the best selling fiction books, in the hardcover fiction category.

Nonfiction
The following list ranks the best selling nonfiction books, in the hardcover nonfiction category.

See also
 Publishers Weekly list of bestselling novels in the United States in the 2000s

References

2000
.
New York Times best sellers
New York Times best sellers
New York Times best sellers